The Uruguayan departments are subdivided into municipalities and, as of 2022, there are 125 municipalities. This second level administrative division system was created by Law No. 18567 of 13 September 2009 and the first municipalities were created (or converted from Local Boards in the previous system) in March 2010. In the municipal elections of 2010 municipal authorities were elected for the first time and they assumed office months later. 

Each municipality is governed by a local council, made up of 5 members. The chairperson of the local council is known as alcalde (mayor) and the remaining members are the councilors.

The Montevideo, Canelones and Maldonado departments are completely covered by municipalities, while the other departments have areas not included in any municipality.

Description

Establishment of the system and creation of municipalities 
The municipalities' system was created by Law No. 18567 of 13 September 2009. The current system is ruled by Law No. 19272 of 18 September 2014. This regulation provided that in settlements with more than 2,000 inhabitants a municipality was to be created including their surrounding territories, as long as it consisted in a social and cultural unit with their own common interests, that justified the creation of this kind of political entity. Settlements with less than 2,000 inhabitants were allowed to establish a municipality if the Departmental Board voted for it after the Intendant proposal, or by popular initiative of at least the 15% of voters in the settlement. Municipalities in departmental seats were only allowed to be created by Departmental Boards after the Intendant's proposal.

Election of authorities and government 
The municipalities are governed by a local council made up by five members, whose chairperson is known as alcalde (mayor) and the other four members are known as concejales (councilors). They are elected by direct vote each municipal elections, at the same time the departmental authorities are elected.

List of municipalities by department

Artigas

Canelones

Cerro Largo
Aceguá
Arbolito
Arévalo
Bañado de Medina
Centurión
Cerro de las Cuentas
Fraile Muerto
Isidoro Noblía
Las Cañas
Plácido Rosas
Quebracho
Ramón Trigo
Río Branco
Tres Islas
Tupambaé

Colonia
Carmelo
Colonia Valdense
Florencio Sánchez
Juan L. Lacaze
La Paz
Miguelete
Nueva Helvecia
Nueva Palmira
Ombúes de Lavalle
Rosario
Tarariras

Durazno
Sarandí del Yí
Villa del Carmen

Flores
Ismael Cortinas

Florida
Casupá
Fray Marcos
Sarandí Grande

Lavalleja
José Batlle y Ordóñez
José Pedro Varela
Mariscala
Solís de Mataojo

Maldonado
Aiguá
Garzón
Maldonado
Pan de Azúcar
Piriápolis
Punta del Este
San Carlos
Solís Grande

Montevideo

Municipality A
Municipality B
Municipality C
Municipality CH
Municipality D
Municipality E
Municipality F
Municipality G

Paysandú
Chapicuy
Guichón
Lorenzo Geyres
Piedras Coloradas
Porvenir
Quebracho
Tambores

Río Negro
Nuevo Berlín
San Javier
Young

Rivera
Minas de Corrales
Tranqueras
Vichadero

Rocha
Castillos
Chuy
La Paloma
Lascano

Salto
Belén
Colonia Lavalleja
Mataojo
Rincón de Valentín
San Antonio
Villa Constitución

San José
Ciudad del Plata
Ecilda Paullier
Libertad
Rodríguez

Soriano
Cardona
Dolores
José Enrique Rodó
Palmitas

Tacuarembó
Ansina
Paso de los Toros
San Gregorio de Polanco

Treinta y Tres
Cerro Chato
Enrique Martínez
Rincón
Santa Clara de Olimar
Vergara
Villa Sara

References

External links

 Ley Nº 18.644 del 12 de febrero de 2010
 Ley Nº 18.653 del 15 de marzo de 2010
 Listado y ubicación de los Municipios en Uruguay - Oficina de Planeamiento y Presupuesto
 Alcaldes y alcaldesas asumen en los 125 Municipios de Uruguay - Elecciones 2020
 Mapa de los municipios de Montevideo
 El Observador: Recorrido por las alcaldías del Departamento de Montevideo
 Corte Electoral- Resultados de las elecciones generales-locales 2010

 
Subdivisions of Uruguay
Uruguay, Departments
Municipalities, Uruguay
Uruguay geography-related lists
Uruguay